Phasca is a genus of tephritid   or fruit flies in the family Tephritidae.

References

Phytalmiinae
Tephritidae genera